Jema'a (also written Ajemaa and Jama'a) is a Local Government Area in southern Kaduna State, Nigeria with headquarters at Kafanchan. The Local Government Council is chaired by Yunana Barde. It has an area of 1,384 km2 and a population of 278,202 at the 2006 census. The postal code of the area is 801.

Boundaries
Jema'a Local Government Area shares boundaries with Zangon Kataf Local Government Area to the north, Jaba Local Government Area to the west, Sanga Local Government Area to the east, Kaura Local Government Area to the northeast, Plateau State to the east and Nasarawa State to the south respectively.

Administrative subdivisions
Jema'a Local Government Area consists of 12 subdivisions (second-order administrative divisions) namely:
 Asso
 Atuku
 Barde
 Gidan Waya (formerly Jema'a)
 Godogodo 
 Jagindi
 Kafanchan A
 Kafanchan B
 Kagoma (Gwong)
 Kaninkon (Nikyob)
 Maigizo (Kadajya)
 Takau

People
Jema'a Local Government Area consist of a number of related ethnic groups and subgroups as well as a migrant population from other parts of the country, especially in the Local Government Area headquarters of Kafanchan (Fantswam) and the towns of Jema'a, Dangoma and Jagindi where the migrating Fulani population from Kajuru were accepted by the locals and settled in the early 19th century.

The ethnic groups and subgroups in Jema'a LGA include: Atyuku (Atuku), Fantswam, Gwong, Nikyob, Nindem and Nyankpa. Others are: Atyap, Bajju, Berom, Fulani, Hausa, Ham, Igbo and Yoruba.

Population
According to the March 21, 2006 national population census, Jema'a (Ajemaa)  had a population of 278,202. Its population was projected by the National Population Commission of Nigeriahttps://nationalpopulation.gov.ng/ and National Bureau of Statistics to be 375,500 by March 21, 2016.

Economy
The people of the local government are predominantly farmers, cultivating cash crops such as cotton, peanuts and ginger; and food crops such as corn, millet and sorghum in subsistent qualities. There is also an old tin mining tunnel site in the town of Godogodo.

Notable people

 Joseph Bagobiri, First Bishop of Catholic Diocese Kafachan and clergy 
 Musa Didam, paramount ruler
 Joe El, singer, songwriter
 Josiah Kantiyok, consultant, paramount ruler
 Victor Moses, footballer
 Patrick Yakowa, former state governor
 Luka Yusuf, military service

References

External links
List of Towns and Villages in Jema'a LGA on Nigeria ZIP codes
Rural Areas in Jema'a L.G.A. on Postcodes.NG

Local Government Areas in Kaduna State